The Poet Laureate of Colorado is the poet laureate for the U.S. state of Colorado. Colorado Poets Laureate are appointed to four-year terms. They are nominated by Colorado Creative Industries and Colorado Humanities & Center for the Book, and chosen by the Governor. The State of Colorado also appointed singer/songwriter John Denver in 1974.

List of Poets Laureate

The following have held the position: 
Alice Polk Hill (1919-1921)
Nellie Burget Miller (1923-1952)
Margaret Clyde Robinson (1952-1954)
Milford E. Shields (1954-1975)
Thomas Hornsby Ferril (1979-1988)
Mary Crow (1996-2010)
David Mason (2010-2014)
Joseph Hutchison (2014-2019)
Bobby LeFebre (2019-present)

External links
Poets Laureate of Colorado at the Library of Congress
Poet Laureate at Colorado Humanities

See also

 Poet laureate
 List of U.S. states' poets laureate
 United States Poet Laureate

References

 
Colorado culture
American Poets Laureate